

The Chyetverikov MDR-6 was a 1930s Soviet Union reconnaissance flying-boat aircraft, and the only successful aircraft designed by the design bureau led by Igor Chyetverikov.

Development
First flying in July 1937, the MDR-6 was a two-engined high-wing monoplane of all-metal stressed skin construction.  The prototype was powered by two M-25 radial engines. A production run of 20 units powered by M-63 engines were produced in 1940 and 1941.  All the aircraft were withdrawn from service in 1942 due to structural problems.

Several progressively advanced prototypes were built from 1939 to 1945, but no further production ensued.

Variants
 MDR-6
Initial prototype.  One built.
Chye-2
Production version powered by M-63 radial engine.  20 built.
 MDR-6A
Redesign with smaller wing and two Klimov M-105 V-12 engines.
 MDR-6B-1 to B-3
Refined developments of MDR-6A.  Three prototypes built.
 MDR-6B-4 to B5
 New, much larger hull, powered by Klimov VK-107 engines.  Two prototypes built.

Operators

Soviet Naval Aviation

Specifications (MDR-6A)

See also

References

Bibliography

External links

 Chetverikov MDR-6

MDR-6
1930s Soviet patrol aircraft
Aircraft first flown in 1937
Flying boats
High-wing aircraft
Gull-wing aircraft
Twin piston-engined tractor aircraft
Twin-tail aircraft